The Secretary of State for Foreign and Global Affairs (SEAEX) is a senior minister of the Ministry of Foreign Affairs, European Union and Cooperation of the Government of Spain. Although he or she has the same rank as the other Secretaries of State of the Department, the SEAEX is considered the second-in-command to the Minister.

The Secretary of State for Foreign Affairs is responsible for the planning and executing the foreign policy of the central government in its global aspects and in some specific geographical and thematic areas.

Specifically, he or she is responsible for the coordination and following of the Spanish participation in the Common Foreign Policy and Security of the European Union, for the foreign policy regarding the United Nations and the rest of the international organizations and the establishment of economic relations with other nations. Furthermore, the SEAEX is in charge of international issues like terrorism, security, construction of and maintainment of peace, non-proliferation and nuclear disarmament and human rights.

Most of the European Union and rest of Europe competences are assumed by the Secretary of State for the European Union, with the exception of those for Eastern Europe. The SEAEX is also responsible for the foreign policy regarding the Maghreb, Africa, the Mediterranean, the Middle East, North America, Asia and the Pacific.

History
The Secretariat of State for Foreign Affairs was created in 1979 as a body of «general competence» destinated to help the Foreign Minister in his duties. This body was suppressed in 1982 and its competences were re-assumed by the Minister.

In 1985, the department was reactivated with the level of General Secretariat and was called General Secretariat for Foreign Policy and the Secretary General had the rank of Under Secretary. In 1996, with the change of government, the General Secretariat was subordinated to a new Secretariat of State called Secretariat of State for Foreign Policy and for the European Union, assuming the coordinations competences of the General Secretariat and the competences of the Secretariat of State for the European Union. This was reverted again in 2000 when the secretariat of state was split in two.

In 2004, the new government gave the competencies over Ibero-America to this Secretariat of State that before belonged to the Secretariat of State for International Cooperation but in 2008 this competences were assumed by a new Secretariat of State for Ibero-America and were re-assumed again in the very late 2010 under the name of Secretariat of State for Foreign and Ibero-American Affairs.

With the Rajoy government, the Secretariat of State established its current structure, with the exception of everything regarding Ibero-America and the Caribbean, which was established in 2020.

Names
 Secretary of State for Foreign Affairs (1979-1982).
 Competences assumed by the Minister between 1982 and 1985.
 General Secretariat for Foreign Policy (1985-1996).
 Secretary of State for Foreign Policy and for the European Union (1996-2000).
 Secretary of State for Foreign Affairs (2000-2004).
 Secretary of State for Foreign Affairs and Ibero-America (2004-2008).
 Secretary of State for Foreign Affairs (2008-2010).
 Secretary of State for Foreign and Ibero-American Affairs. (2010-2011).
 Secretary of State for Foreign Affairs (2011–2020)
 Secretary of State for Foreign Affairs and for Ibero-America and the Caribbean (2020–2021)
Secretary of State for Foreign and Global Affairs (2021–present)

Structure
The Secretariat of State is composed of six departments, all of them run by a Director-General:

 The Directorate-General for Foreign Policy and Security.
 It's the department that implements the directives of the Secretary of State for Foreign Affairs in the functions of assisting the Minister of Foreign Affairs, the European Union and Cooperation in the formulation and execution of foreign policy in its global approaches and objectives, and, especially, in the coordination of Spanish foreign policy with regard to the Common Foreign and Security Policy of the European Union under the guidance of the European Council and of the decisions adopted by Foreign Affairs Council.
 The Directorate-General for the United Nations and Human Rights.
 It's responsible for the participation of Spain in all the bodies of the United Nations, of establish the position of Spain regarding international community issues, the participation of Spain in the international organizations about matter of its competences and specifically in climate change and environment organizations and the promotion of human rights in the United Nations, the Council of Europe and the Organization for Security and Co-operation in Europe and the participation in this kind of organizations.
 The Directorate-General for the Maghreb, the Mediterranean and the Middle East.
 It's the department in charge of the proposal and execution of the foreign policy of Spain in its corresponding geographical area, the promotion of bilateral relations with the countries it encompasses and the follow-up of the initiatives and multilateral forums of the geographic area of its competence.
 The Directorate-General for Africa.
 It's the department in charge of the proposal and execution of the foreign policy of Spain in the African continent, the promotion of bilateral relations with the countries it encompasses and the follow-up of the initiatives and multilateral forums of the geographic area of its competence.
 The Directorate-General for North America, Eastern Europe, Asia and Pacific.
 It's the department in charge of the proposal and execution of the foreign policy of Spain in its corresponding geographical area, the promotion of bilateral relations with the countries it encompasses, the follow-up of the initiatives and multilateral forums of the geographic area of its competence and the impulse to the Foundations Council Spain-United States, Spain-China, Spain-Japan, Spain-India and Spain-Australia.

List of SEAEX

References

Secretaries of State of Spain
Foreign ministers of Spain